The Tigris is the easternmost of the two great rivers that define Mesopotamia, the other being the Euphrates. The river flows south from the mountains of the Armenian Highlands through the Syrian and Arabian Deserts, and empties into the Persian Gulf.

Geography
The river then flows for  through Southeastern Turkey before becoming part of the Syria-Turkey border. Some of its affluences are Garzan, Anbarçayi, Batman, and the Great and the Little Zab.

Close to its confluence with the Euphrates, the Tigris splits into several channels. First, the artificial Shatt al-Hayy branches off, to join the Euphrates near Nasiriyah. Second, the Shatt al-Muminah and Majar al-Kabir branch off to feed the Central Marshes. Further downstream, two other distributary channels branch off (the Al-Musharrah and Al-Kahla), to feed the Hawizeh Marshes. The main channel continues southwards and is joined by the Al-Kassarah, which drains the Hawizeh Marshes. Finally, the Tigris joins the Euphrates near al-Qurnah to form the Shatt-al-Arab. According to Pliny and other ancient historians, the Euphrates originally had its outlet into the sea separate from that of the Tigris.

Baghdad, the capital of Iraq, stands on the banks of the Tigris. The port city of Basra straddles the Shatt al-Arab. In ancient times, many of the great cities of Mesopotamia stood on or near the Tigris, drawing water from it to irrigate the civilization of the Sumerians. Notable Tigris-side cities included Nineveh, Ctesiphon, and Seleucia, while the city of Lagash was irrigated by the Tigris via a canal dug around 2900 B.C.

Navigation
The Tigris has long been an important transport route in a largely desert country. Shallow-draft vessels can go as far as Baghdad, but rafts are needed for transport upstream to Mosul.

Etymology 

The Ancient Greek form Tigris is an alternative form of Tígrēs, which was adapted from Old Persian  (t-i-g-r-a /Tigrā/), itself from Elamite Tigra, itself from Sumerian  (Idigna or Idigina, probably derived from *id (i)gina "running water"). The Sumerian term, which can be interpreted as "the swift river", contrasts the Tigris to its neighbour, the Euphrates, whose leisurely pace caused it to deposit more silt and build up a higher bed than the Tigris. The Sumerian form was borrowed into Akkadian as Idiqlat and from there into the other Semitic languages (compare Hebrew Ḥîddeqel, Syriac Deqlaṯ, Arabic Dijlah).

Another name for the Tigris used in Middle Persian was Arvand Rud, literally "swift river". Today, however, Arvand Rud refers to the confluence of the Euphrates and Tigris rivers, known in Arabic as the Shatt al-Arab. In Kurdish, it is known as Ava Mezin, "the Great Water".

The name of the Tigris in languages that have been important in the region:

Management and water quality

The Tigris is heavily dammed in Iraq and Turkey to provide water for irrigating the arid and semi-desert regions bordering the river valley. Damming has also been important for averting floods in Iraq, to which the Tigris has historically been notoriously prone following April melting of snow in the Turkish mountains. Mosul Dam is the largest dam in Iraq.

Recent Turkish damming of the river has been the subject of some controversy, for both its environmental effects within Turkey and its potential to reduce the flow of water downstream.

Water from both rivers is used as a means of pressure during conflicts.

In 2014 a major breakthrough in developing consensus between multiple stakeholder representatives of Iraq and Turkey on a Plan of Action for promoting exchange and calibration of data and standards pertaining to Tigris river flows was achieved. The consensus which is referred to as the "Geneva Consensus On Tigris River" was reached at a meeting organized in Geneva by the think tank Strategic Foresight Group.

In February 2016, the United States Embassy in Iraq as well as the Prime Minister of Iraq Haider al-Abadi issued warnings that Mosul Dam could collapse. The United States warned people to evacuate the floodplain of the Tigris because between 500,000 and 1.5 million people were at risk of drowning due to flash flood if the dam collapses, and that the major Iraqi cities of Mosul, Tikrit, Samarra, and Baghdad were at risk.

Religion and mythology 
In Sumerian mythology, the Tigris was created by the god Enki, who filled the river with flowing water.

In Hittite and Hurrian mythology, Aranzah (or Aranzahas in the Hittite nominative form) is the Hurrian name of the Tigris River, which was deified. He was the son of Kumarbi and the brother of Teshub and Tašmišu, one of the three gods spat out of Kumarbi's mouth onto Mount Kanzuras. Later he colluded with Anu and the Teshub to destroy Kumarbi (The Kumarbi Cycle).

The Tigris appears twice in the Old Testament. First, in the Book of Genesis, it is the third of the four rivers branching off the river issuing out of the Garden of Eden. The second mention is in the Book of Daniel, wherein Daniel states he received one of his visions "when I was by that great river the Tigris".

The Tigris River is also mentioned in Islam in Sahih Al-Bukhari and Muslim which described the river (Euphrates) will dry up near the end time to unveil a treasure of gold and has prohibited anybody to take the gold  The tomb of Imam Ahmad Bin Hanbal and Syed Abdul Razzaq Jilani is in Baghdad and the flow of Tigris restricts the number of visitors.

Baháʼu'lláh, the founder of the Baháʼí Faith, also wrote The Hidden Words around 1858 while he walked along the banks of the Tigris river during his exile in Baghdad.

The river featured on the coat of arms of Iraq from 1932 to 1959.

See also
 Assyria
 Cradle of civilization
 Ilisu Dam Campaign campaign against a dam on Tigris in Turkey
 List of places in Iraq
 Mountains of Ararat
 Wildlife of Iraq
 Zagros Mountains

References

External links

 Livius.org: Tigris
 
 Managing the Tigris and Euphrates Watershed
Bibliography on Water Resources and International Law Peace Palace Library
 Outline of WWI Battles involving the Tigris River
Old maps of the Tigris, Eran Laor Cartographic Collection, The National Library of Israel

 
International rivers of Asia
Rivers of Iraq
Rivers of Kurdistan
Rivers of Syria
Rivers of Turkey
Mesopotamia
Upper Mesopotamia
Tur Abdin
Levant
Geography of Iraqi Kurdistan
Landforms of Elazığ Province
Landforms of Diyarbakır Province
Landforms of Batman Province
Landforms of Siirt Province
Landforms of Şırnak Province
Border rivers
Water and religion
Rivers in Mandaeism